The 40th Annual GMA Dove Awards presentation was held on April 23, 2009 recognizing accomplishments of musicians for the year 2008. The show was held at the Grand Ole Opry House in Nashville, Tennessee, and was hosted by Rebecca St. James, Matthew West, and Lisa Kimmey.

Nominations were announced on February 20, 2009 by Lisa Kimmey, Dan Evans and Jackie Evans during a press conference at the Nashville Convention & Visitors Bureau Visitor Information Center in Nashville, Tennessee.

Steven Curtis Chapman won two awards, including Artist of the Year and Songwriter of the Year, while Tenth Avenue North won New Artist of the Year. Casting Crowns and Brandon Heath each won three awards. Other multiple winners include: Third Day, The Blind Boys of Alabama, and Michael W. Smith.

Performers

Pre-telecast
Meredith Andrews
Downhere
J.R.

Telecast ceremony
The following performed:

Presenters

Telecast ceremony
The following presented:

William Baldwin
Chyna Vaughan (Chyna Phillips and Vaughan Penn)
Sinbad
A.J. Styles
Mandisa
Phil Stacey
Casting Crowns
Fireflight
Michael W. Smith – introduced Steven Curtis Chapman
Kirk Franklin
Richie McDonald
Ronnie Milsap
Tye Tribbett
Jeremy Camp
Martha Munizzi
Mary Alessi
DecembeRadio
GRITS
Jason Crabb
Kim Hopper
The Afters
Canton Jones
Isaiah D. Thomas
Marty Magehee
Mark Harris
Wayne Watson
Damita Haddon
Mac Powell – introduced the "Oh Happy Day" tribute
Carrie Prejean – introduced MercyMe

Awards

General
Artist of the Year
Casting Crowns
Steven Curtis Chapman
Fireflight
Marvin Sapp
Third Day
TobyMac
Chris Tomlin

New Artist of the Year
Addison Road
Francesca Battistelli
Fee
Jonathan Nelson
Remedy Drive
Chris Sligh
Tenth Avenue North

Group of the Year
Casting Crowns
David Crowder Band
Ernie Haase & Signature Sound
Mary Mary
MercyMe
Skillet
Third Day

Male Vocalist of the Year
Jeremy Camp
Jon Foreman
Ernie Haase
Brandon Heath
David Phelps
Marvin Sapp
Chris Tomlin

Female Vocalist of the Year
Francesca Battistelli
Brooke Fraser
Karen Peck Gooch
Natalie Grant
Mandisa
Sandi Patty
Laura Story

Song of the Year
"Amazing Grace (My Chains Are Gone)" – Chris Tomlin
Louie Giglio, Chris Tomlin, songwriters
"Cinderella" – Steven Curtis Chapman
Steven Curtis Chapman, songwriter
"Empty Me" – Chris Sligh
Chris Sligh, Clint Lagerberg, Tony Wood
"Give Me Your Eyes" – Brandon Heath
Brandon Heath, Jason Ingram, songwriters
"I Will Not Be Moved" – Natalie Grant
Natalie Grant, songwriter
"I'm Letting Go" – Francesca Battistelli
Francesca Battistelli, Tony Wood, Ian Eskelin, songwriters
Mighty to Save – Hillsong Church
Ben Fielding, Reuben Morgan, songwriters
"Never Going Back to OK" – The Afters
Matt Fuqua, Josh Havens, Brad Wigg, Dan Muckala, songwriters
"Reason Enough" – Ernie Haase & Signature Sound
Ernie Haase, Wayne Haun, Joel Lindsey, songwriters
"You Reign" – MercyMe
Bart Millard, Barry Graul, Steven Curtis Chapman, songwriters

Songwriter of the Year
Steven Curtis Chapman

Producer of the Year
Brown Bannister
Ed Cash
Ian Eskelin
Wayne Haun
Bernie Herms
Jason Ingram and Rusty Varenkamp

Pop
Pop/Contemporary Recorded Song of the Year
 "Cinderella" – Steven Curtis Chapman
 "Give Me Your Eyes" – Brandon Heath
 "I Will Not Be Moved" – Natalie Grant
 "I’m Letting Go" – Francesca Battistelli
 "This Is Home" – Switchfoot

Pop/Contemporary Album of the Year
 Bebo Norman – Bebo Norman
 Fall & Winter – Jon Foreman
 My Paper Heart – Francesca Battistelli
 Relentless – Natalie Grant
 Revelation – Third DayRock
Rock Recorded Song of the Year
 "Better Man" – DecembeRadio
 "For The Love Of The Game" – Pillar
 "Lost" – Red "Shine Like The Stars" – Stellar Kart
 "The Hunger" – Fireflight

Rock/Contemporary Recorded Song of the Year
 "Find You Waiting" – DecembeRadio
 "Keys To The Kingdom" – Group 1 Crew
 "Never Going Back To OK" – The Afters
 "Unbreakable" – Fireflight
 "Washed by the Water" – NeedtobreatheRock Album of the Year
 Comatose Comes Alive – Skillet
 For The Love Of The Game – Pillar
 Satisfied – DecembeRadio Southern Hospitality – Disciple
 To Know That You're Alive – Kutless

Rock/Contemporary Album of the Year
 Daylight Is Coming – Remedy Drive
 Expect the Impossible – Stellar Kart
 Hello – After Edmund
 Never Going Back to OK – The Afters Unbreakable – Fireflight

Rap/Hip-Hop
Rap/Hip-Hop Recorded Song of the Year
 "Beautiful Morning" – GRITS, featuring Pigeon John
 "Do Yo Thang" – KJ-52 "Joyful Noise" – Flame, featuring Lecrae & John Reilly
 "Pull Your Pants Up!" – Dooney “Da Priest”
 "So Beautiful" – Manafest, featuring Trevor McNevan

Rap/Hip-Hop Album of the Year
 Citizens Activ – Manafest
 Ordinary Dreamers – Group 1 Crew Pull Your Pants Up! – Dooney “Da Priest”
 Rebel – Lecrae
 Reiterate – GRITS

Inspirational
Inspirational Recorded Song of the Year
 "A New Hallelujah" – Michael W. Smith "For The Glory Of You" – Mark Harris
 "Bless The Lord" – Laura Story
 "Come Thou Fount" – Jadon Lavik
 "Dependence" – Jamie Slocum

Inspirational Album of the Year
 After The Rain – Aaron & Amanda Crabb
 Great God Who Saves – Laura Story Infinite Grace – Women of Faith Worship Team
 Roots Run Deep – Jadon Lavik
 Songs For The Journey – Sandi Patty

Gospel
Southern Gospel Recorded Song of the Year
 "Big Mighty God" – The Mike LeFevre Quartet
 "I Believe God" – Brian Free & Assurance
 "Reason Enough" – Ernie Haase & Signature Sound "Welcome To The Family" – Booth Brothers
 "Yahweh" – The Hoppers

Southern Gospel Album of the Year
Ephesians One – Karen Peck & New River
I Just Wanted You To Know – Kim HopperLovin' Life – Gaither Vocal BandOn The Way Up – HisSong
Room For More – Booth Brothers

Traditional Gospel Recorded Song of the Year
 "Cry Your Last Tear" – Bishop Paul S. Morton & the Full Gospel Baptist Church Fellowship Mass Choir
 "Deliverance" – Lillie Knauls
 "Free At Last" – The Blind Boys of Alabama "God Is Good" – Regina Belle
 "Souled Out" – Hezekiah Walker & LFC
 "Take It Back" – Dorinda Clark-Cole

Traditional Gospel Album of the Year
 A New Day – Paul Porter
 After 40 Years... Still Sweeping Through the City – Shirley Caesar
 Cry Your Last Tear – Bishop Paul S. Morton & the Full Gospel Baptist Church Fellowship Mass Choir
 Do It! – Dottie Peoples
 Down In New Orleans – The Blind Boys of AlabamaContemporary Gospel Recorded Song of the Year
 "Favor Of God" – Martha Munizzi
 "Great Grace" – Alvin Slaughter
 "How Great Is Our God" – LaRue Howard "My Name Is Victory" – Jonathan Nelson
 "Shall We Gather at the River?" – Take 6
 "Waging War" – CeCe Winans

Contemporary Gospel Album of the YearChange the World – Martha MunizziStand Out – Tye Tribbett & G.A.
The Sound – Mary Mary
The Standard – Take 6
Thy Kingdom Come – CeCe Winans

Country & Bluegrass
Country Recorded Song of the Year
"Did I Make A Difference" – The Oak Ridge Boys
"Good Side Of Goodbye" – Living Waters Trio
"I Saw God Today" – George Strait"I Wish" – Point of Grace"Jesus and John Wayne" – Gaither Vocal Band

Country Album of the YearAround the Bend – Randy TravisHome For Now – Living Waters Trio
Hymned Again – Bart Millard
I Turn to You – Richie McDonald
Runaway Train – Crabb Revival

Bluegrass Recorded Song of the Year
"Help Is On The Way" – Doyle Lawson & Quicksilver
"I See a Crimson Stream" – Janet Paschal
"The Old White Flag" – Triumphant Quartet"They’re Holding Up The Ladder" – Jeff & Sheri Easter, The Lewis Family, and The Easter Brothers"What Will I Wear" – Kim Hopper

Bluegrass Album of the Year
Bluegrass Worship – Various artists
Help Is On The Way – Doyle Lawson & Quicksilver
Hymns From Chigger Hill – Chigger Hill Boys & Terri
I Don’t Regret A Mile – Larry Sparks
Pickin’, Praisin’, & Singin’: Hymns From The Mountain – Cody Shuler & Pine Mountain RailroadWe Are Family – Jeff & Sheri Easter, The Lewis Family, and The Easter BrothersWhat A Journey – Paul Williams & The Victory Trio

Praise & Worship
Worship Song of the Year
"A New Hallelujah" – Michael W. Smith
Michael W. Smith, Debbie Smith, Paul Baloche, songwriters
"Breathe On Me" – Natalie Grant
Natalie Grant, songwriter
"Jesus Messiah" – Chris Tomlin
Chris Tomlin, Daniel Carson, Jesse Reeves, Ed Cash, songwriters"Mighty to Save" – Hillsong ChurchBen Fielding, Reuben Morgan, songwriters"You’re Not Alone" – Meredith Andrews
Meredith Andrews, songwriter

Praise & Worship Album of the YearA New Hallelujah – Michael W. SmithGreat God Who Saves – Laura Story
Hello Love – Chris Tomlin
Opposite Way – Leeland
The Invitation – Meredith Andrews

Urban
Urban Recorded Song of the Year
"Declaration (This Is It)" – Kirk Franklin"Get Up" – Mary Mary"Love Him Like I Do" – Deitrick Haddon with Ruben Studdard and Mary Mary
"No Looking Back" – Damita
"Not A Slave" – J.R.

Urban Album of the Year
Bold Right Life – Kierra SheardThe Fight of My Life – Kirk FranklinKingdom Business – Canton Jones
No Looking Back – Damita
Revealed – Deitrick Haddon

Others
Instrumental Album of the Year
A Treasury of Hymns – LaDonna
Always There – Harold Rayford
Born to Play – Barry D.Chronicles of Narnia: Prince Caspian (soundtrack)various artists – Harry Gregson-Williams (composer)Love Beyond All Measure – Stephen Petrunak
The Breath of Life – Angella Christie

Children's Music Album of the YearAbsolute Modern Worship for Kids 4 – Various artistsAll God’s Animals – TJ McCloud
David: Shepherd, Psalmist, Soldier, King! – Bible StorySongs
Shout Praises Kids – I Am Free – Jeff Sandstrom, Kurt Goebel, Stephen Leiweke, and Jeremy Redmon
Sleepytime Lullabies – Praise Baby
Tell The World – Hillsong Kids

Spanish Language Album of the Year
Abriras Las Puertas – Malin
Alabanza y Adoracion: Del Corazon – Lucia Parker
Mi Salvacion – Ingrid Rosario
Refréscate! – Aline BarrosRescátame – Seventh Day SlumberSobrenatural – Marcos Witt
Tengo Sed de Tí – Soraya Moraes

Special Event Album of the Year
Billy: The Early Years Official Motion Picture Soundtrack (Arista Nashville/Essential Records)
Country Bluegrass Homecoming Volume One (Gaither Music Group)
How Great Thou Art: Gospel Favorites from the Grand Ole Opry (Sony BMG Nashville)Passion: God of This City (Sixsteps Records)Your Name (Integrity Music)

Christmas Album of the Year
Christmas Gaither Vocal Band Style – Gaither Vocal Band
Christmas Songs – Fernando Ortega
Home for Christmas – BarlowGirl
O Holy Night – Sara GrovesPeace on Earth – Casting CrownsChoral Collection of the Year
Cradle That Rocked The World – Geron Davis, Christopher Phillips, Jukka Palonen
Glorious Day – David Moffitt, Sue C. Smith, Travis Cottrell
He Still Leads – Christ Church Choir – Landy Gardner, Joy Gardner, Christopher PhillipsI’ll Say Yes – Carol CymbalaMake a Joyful Noise – Regi Stone

Recorded Music Packaging of the Year
…Is My Friend – Hawk Nelson
Remedy Club Tour Edition – David Crowder BandRevelation – Third DayStorm the Gates of Hell (Deluxe Edition) – Demon Hunter
The Tide Will Swallow Us Whole – Trenches

Musicals
Musical of the Year
Child of Wonder
East to WestGod Bless the USA
Savior
The Risen Christ

Youth/Children's Musical
An Island Christmas
Angels We Have Heard
It’s a Wonder-Full Life
Lifesong
The Christmas County Spelling Bee

Videos
Short Form Music Video of the Year
"Daylight" – Remedy Drive
Andy & Jon Erwin (video directors)
"Fan Mail" – KJ-52
Sam Sanchez (video director and producer)
"In the Valley of the Dying Sun" – House of Heroes
Danny Yourd (video director), Steve Hoover (video producer)
"Movin’" – Group 1 Crew
Andy & Jon Erwin (video directors), Dan Atchison (video producer)
"Slow Fade" – Casting Crowns
Andy & Jon Erwin (video directors)

Long Form Music Video of the Year
Alive and Transported – TobyMac
Eric Welch (video director), Tameron Hedge and Dan Pitts (video producers)
Comatose Comes Alive – Skillet
Carl Diebold (video director), Diebold, Paul Kerby, and Zachary Kelm (video producers)
Country Bluegrass Homecoming Volume One – Bill & Gloria Gaither
Doug Stuckey (video director), Bill Gaither (video producer)
O Holy Night – David Phelps
David Phelps and Jimmy Abegg (video directors), Phelps, Abegg, Jim Chaffee, and Ben Pearson (video producers)
The Altar and the Door Live – Casting Crowns
Andy & Jon Erwin (video directors)

Artists with multiple nominations and awards 

The following artists received multiple nominations:
 Seven: Chris Tomlin
 Five: Natalie Grant, Francesca Battistelli, Casting Crowns, Steven Curtis Chapman
 Four: Fireflight
 Two: TobyMac, Marvin Sapp

The following artists received multiple awards:
 Three: Casting Crowns, Brandon Heath
 Two: Steven Curtis Chapman, Third Day, The Blind Boys of Alabama, Michael W. Smith

References

, official winners list by year

External links
Dove Awards winners at DoveAwards.com
Nominations Announced for 40th GMA Dove Awards at CBN Music
GMA Dove Awards Nominations for 2009 Announced at GospelMusicUpdate

GMA Music Awards
GMA Dove Awards
2009 in American music
2009 in Tennessee
GMA